Chyler Leigh West (pronounced  ; née Potts; born April 10, 1982), known professionally as Chyler Leigh, is an American actress, singer and model. She is known for portraying Janey Briggs in the comedy film Not Another Teen Movie (2001), Lexie Grey in the ABC medical drama series Grey's Anatomy (2007–2012), and Alex Danvers in the DC Comics superhero series Supergirl (2015–2021).

Early life
Leigh was born in Charlotte, North Carolina on April 10, 1982, to Yvonne Norton and Robert Potts. She was raised in Virginia Beach, Virginia, where her parents ran a weight-loss business. The business went bankrupt when she was eight and her parents' marriage ended when she was 12; she, her mother, and her older brotherformer actor Christopher Khayman Leethen moved to Miami, where her mother remarried her first husband. Leigh was estranged from her father for many years following her parents' divorce, but they have since reconciled.

Leigh was in eighth grade when she started modelling. She soon began acting by appearing in local television commercials and a syndicated teen news show, Hall Pass. In 1999, Leigh and her mother relocated to Los Angeles so she could develop her acting career. At 16, she took and passed the California High School Proficiency Exam.

Drug addiction and recovery
At age 16, Leigh met her future husband, 20-year-old Nathan West, when they both attended auditions for the pilot of an unsuccessful WB series titled Saving Graces. They began a relationship, and Leigh left home to move in with West. Leigh described them as being "broken", both having had troubled family lives and difficult upbringings. This led to abuse of drugs such as cocaine, which quickly escalated into addiction. The catalysts for change eventually came in 2001, when Leigh, in the throes of addiction and barely eating, was told by the director of Not Another Teen Movie that she looked unhealthily thin. Around that time, she and West also attended a Christian church service, at the invitation of a friend, which helped them in recovery, and the two were subsequently married.

Career

Leigh started acting at an early age and debuted in the film world at age 15 in 1997's Kickboxing Academy. She started hosting in local TV shows and modeling; in 2001, Leigh nabbed the lead role in the box-office success Not Another Teen Movie as Janey Briggs. She also appeared with the cast in Marilyn Manson's music video "Tainted Love", a song which appeared in the film. She was ranked #65 on the Maxim Hot 100 Women of 2002. In 2002, Leigh was cast in two short-lived TV series: Girls Club, in which she played lawyer Sarah Mickle, and That '80s Show, in which she played punk rocker June Tuesday. She then became a series regular on the ABC legal drama The Practice, but was let go at the end of the season due to budget cuts. Following that, she joined the cast of Reunion in September 2005.

In ABC's medical drama Grey's Anatomy, Leigh first appeared as a woman in Joe's bar who was noticed by Derek Shepherd during the final two episodes of the third season, and her character is later revealed to be Lexie Grey, the younger half-sister of the titular character. Leigh was made an official series regular for season four and remained so until the eighth-season finale, as Leigh chose to depart from the show after five years to spend more time with her family.

Leigh also makes music with her husband Nathan West (East of Eli), under the name "WestLeigh". They have performed covers and originals songs. In 2015, for their thirteenth anniversary they wrote "Love Lit The Sky". On Valentine's Day 2017, they released the single "Nowhere". Leigh has taken part in several of her husband's tours.

On June 18, 2017, a single "Spirit of Samba" by Laurent Voulzy was released featuring Leigh, Nina Miranda, Luisa Maita and Eloisia; in France it reached the 99th position on the Syndicat National de l'Édition Phonographique (SNEP) chart.

From 2015 to 2021, Leigh starred in the CBS/CW DC Comics television series Supergirl as Alex Danvers, the elder adoptive sister of the titular character and a scientist and government agent at the DEO. She would reprise the role on Arrow, The Flash, and Legends of Tomorrow during crossover events Crisis on Earth-X, Crisis on Infinite Earths, and "Armageddon". She made her directorial debut with the season six episode "Prom Again!".

In April 2021, Leigh returned to Grey's Anatomy for the episode "Breathe".

Personal life

In 2002, Leigh married fellow actor Nathan West in Alaska. The couple worked together in 2000 on the television series 7th Heaven, playing Mary Camden's (Jessica Biel) troubled friends Frankie and Johnnie. Leigh and West have three children – a son and two daughters (born 2003, 2006, and 2009).

Leigh is a Christian and credits her faith and a "really awesome church" with giving her and her husband "a reason to live". She also supports The Thirst Project, a non-profit organization in America which aims to bring safe drinking water to communities around the world.

In 2019, Leigh revealed that she had been diagnosed with bipolar disorder a decade earlier.

In mid-2020, Leigh published a statement on the Create Change website, an advocacy website she co-founded, in which she expressed an emotional connection with her Supergirl character's coming-out scene. Several websites and media outlets, especially those connected with LGBTQ advocacy, interpreted this statement as Leigh's own coming-out about her sexuality.

Leigh and her family previously lived in Los Angeles, but they now split their time between Vancouver and Nashville.

During mid-2020, Leigh contracted COVID-19 and became ill. Leigh described her experience in an article published to createchange.me on October 14, 2020:
I lost about a month's worth of time, laying in bed, waving to my children in the hallway with a mask on so they didn't see how sick I was from COVID-19. Almost "game-over" sick. The only time I had with my husband was spent six feet apart on our bedroom balcony in the morning for a soul-lifting hour to just be with one another or when he donned his mask coming in the room to take care of me, bravely bringing food and Gatorade (which half the time I wasn't able to taste). Golden moments in the midst of darkness. I will say I'm incredibly lucky, though. By the grace of God, no one else got sick. And, although there were a few occasions it almost seemed necessary, I didn't have to go to the hospital. I think getting through a sickness of that magnitude definitely earned me a level up. My body defeated what I thought was impossible and I got a proper restart.

Filmography

Television and film

Music videos 
 "Tainted Love" (2001), by Marilyn Manson

As a producer
 Brake (2012), as co-producer

Awards and nominations

References

External links 

 

20th-century American actresses
21st-century American actresses
21st-century American singers
21st-century American women singers
Actresses from Charlotte, North Carolina
Actresses from Miami
Actresses from North Carolina
Actresses from Virginia
American child actresses
American Christians
American film actresses
American television actresses
Christians from North Carolina
Female models from Florida
Female models from North Carolina
LGBT actresses
LGBT Christians
American LGBT actors
Living people
People from Virginia Beach, Virginia
People with bipolar disorder
21st-century LGBT people
Year of birth missing (living people)